The Husutong Yangtze River Bridge is a combined rail and road bridge which crosses the Yangtze River in Jiangsu, China. It is the easternmost railway crossing of the Yangtze river.

Construction began on 1 March 2014. The Shanghai–Suzhou–Nantong railway (Husutong railway), opened on 1 July 2020, uses this bridge.

On its upper level, it carries a six-lane highway. On its lower level it carries four railway tracks with a design speed of 200 km/h.

See also
 List of bridges in China
 Bridges and tunnels across the Yangtze River
 List of longest cable-stayed bridge spans

References

Bridges over the Yangtze River
Cable-stayed bridges in China
Arch bridges in China
Bridges completed in 2020
Double-decker bridges
Road-rail bridges in China